Falklands Crisis may refer to:

 Falklands Crisis (1770), a dispute over the Falkland Islands between Great Britain and Spain
 Falklands Crisis (1982), the 1982 invasion of the Falkland Islands by Argentina and subsequent recapture by British forces

See also
 Falkland Islands sovereignty dispute
 Reassertion of British sovereignty over the Falkland Islands (1833)
 South Georgia and the South Sandwich Islands sovereignty dispute